Nebula is a fictional character in the Marvel Cinematic Universe (MCU) media franchise, portrayed by Karen Gillan, based on the Marvel Comics character of the same name. She is depicted as a blue-skinned alien warrior who is both the adoptive daughter of Thanos, who killed her blood family before raising her, and the adoptive sister of Gamora, with whom she grew to share a bitter rivalry. Although she is first introduced as the secondary antagonist of Guardians of the Galaxy (2014), subsequent films see her develop into an antihero and eventually a protagonist, who joins her sister as part of the Guardians of the Galaxy and becomes a member of the Avengers and then officially of the Guardians of the Galaxy. Aspects of this interpretation were later integrated into the comics version of the character.

The character was met with positive reception, specifically for Gillan's performance and redemptive story arc; she has been noted for her differences from the comics, in which Nebula is almost exclusively depicted as a villain.

, Nebula has appeared in five films and The Guardians of the Galaxy Holiday Special (2022), as well the animated series What If...? (2021), as alternate versions. She will return in the upcoming film Guardians of the Galaxy Vol. 3 (2023).

Concept and creation
The comic book version of Nebula was created by writer Roger Stern and artist John Buscema, and first appeared in The Avengers #257 (July 1985).

Marvel Studios President Kevin Feige first mentioned Guardians of the Galaxy as a potential film at the 2010 San Diego Comic-Con International, stating, "There are some obscure titles, too, like Guardians of the Galaxy. I think they've been revamped recently in a fun way in the [comic] book." Feige reiterated that sentiment in a September 2011 issue of Entertainment Weekly, saying, "There's an opportunity to do a big space epic, which Thor sort of hints at, in the cosmic side" of the Marvel Cinematic Universe. Feige added, should the film be made, it would feature an ensemble of characters, similar to X-Men and The Avengers. Feige announced that the film was in active development at the 2012 San Diego Comic-Con International during the Marvel Studios panel, with an intended release date of August 1, 2014. He said the film's titular team would consist of the characters Star-Lord, Drax the Destroyer, Gamora, Groot, and Rocket. In July 2013, director James Gunn and the film's cast flew from London to attend San Diego Comic-Con International, where it was revealed that Karen Gillan would play Nebula. Gillan had previously auditioned for Sharon Carter in Captain America: The Winter Soldier when invited to read for the role, with Gunn declaring her test was the favorite out of the film's cast, which he described as seeing her develop "this bald cyber-jerk" out of a "pretty simple character".

Fictional character biography

Early life
Nebula is one of several children forcibly adopted by Thanos. After he killed her family, she was raised alongside Gamora and trained to be a warrior. Thanos often forced them to fight and Gamora was always victorious. After every loss, Thanos would have a piece of Nebula replaced with a cybernetic part, transforming her into a cyborg.

Pursuing Thanos and Gamora

In 2014, Thanos dispatched Nebula and Gamora to assist Ronan the Accuser in obtaining the Power Stone. Ronan succeeded and betrayed Thanos, intending to destroy the planet Xandar and kill Thanos. Nebula sided with him against her father. She escaped Xandar when the Guardians of the Galaxy successfully thwarted Ronan's attack.

Nebula is later captured by members of the Sovereign race as she tries to steal their powerful batteries; the Sovereign give her to the Guardians in exchange for their services defending the batteries. When the other Guardians visit the planet of Peter Quill's father, Ego, Nebula helps the Ravagers capture Rocket and Groot. She is given a ship, and goes to Ego herself to fight Gamora. After finally defeating Gamora in combat, Nebula expresses anger at her for always needing to be better than her instead of just being a loving sister. She and Gamora reconcile and ally to fight Ego, ultimately escaping the living planet as it is destroyed. Nebula then resolves to kill Thanos, and leaves with this mission in mind.

Allying with the Avengers

Nebula's attempt to kill Thanos fails, and she is instead captured and tortured on the Sanctuary II. In 2018, Thanos brings Gamora to the ship and shows her Nebula, using her to convince Gamora to reveal the location of the Soul Stone. After Thanos leaves with Gamora, Nebula escapes and takes a ship to Titan, where she again attempts to kill Thanos, and meets with Quill, Mantis, Drax, Tony Stark, Peter Parker, and Stephen Strange. Nebula survives the Blip and is left on Titan with Stark.

Nebula and Stark leave Titan in the Benatar, but the ship, having been damaged, gets stranded in space, until Carol Danvers appears to save them. After reaching the Avengers Compound on Earth, Nebula reunites with Rocket, and accompanies the surviving Avengers into space to the Garden to confront Thanos, who is killed by Thor after revealing that the Stones were destroyed, with Nebula asserting that Thanos' words were true.

Nebula and Rocket, now members of the Avengers, work with Danvers on missions in space. In 2023, Nebula and the other Avengers time travel via the Quantum Realm to an alternate 2014. Nebula goes with James Rhodes to the planet Morag, where they render an alternate version of Quill unconscious and take the Power Stone. However, an alternate version of Nebula begins to malfunction due to the presence of the main Nebula, and the alternate Thanos thereby becomes aware of the presence of Nebula, and has her captured. After analyzing her memories and learning about his future victory and the Avengers' efforts to undo it, alternate Thanos sends alternate Nebula back to the present in Nebula's place. Alternate Nebula then brings alternate Thanos and his army to the main timeline, where he destroys the Compound and orders alternate Nebula to bring him the Infinity Stones. Having escaped after successfully convincing Gamora to abandon Thanos, Nebula confronts her alternate self and tries to convince her to do the same, but is forced to kill her when the latter attempts to kill Gamora in refusal. Nebula then joins the battle against alternate Thanos’ army, and attends Stark's funeral after he sacrifices himself to eliminate Thanos and his forces.

Further adventures

Nebula joins the restored Guardians of the Galaxy, and returns with them to space, where they are accompanied by Thor. They go on several adventures and while on the planet Indigarr, they learn about various distress calls brought about by a god butcher. She and the Guardians leave respond to the calls, as Thor parts way to help his friend.

In 2025, the Guardians buy Knowhere from the Collector, and Nebula helps to refurbish it following the attack it had endured. For Christmas that year, she returns to Earth and takes Bucky Barnes's arm and gives it as a gift to Rocket.

Alternate versions

2014 variant 

An alternate variant of Nebula from before the events of Guardians of the Galaxy appears in Avengers: Endgame. In an alternate 2014, following a training session with Gamora, she and Nebula are summoned by Thanos, who orders them to assist Ronan in obtaining the Power Stone. Before they can leave, however, Nebula begins to malfunction due to the presence of Nebula from the main timeline. After capturing the "prime" Nebula, Thanos analyzes her memories and learns about his prime self's victory, and the Avengers' efforts to undo it. He then has the prime Nebula replaced with her alternate self, who is sent back to the present in the main timeline to prepare for his arrival. Alternate Nebula brings alternate Thanos and his army to 2023, whereupon he destroys the Avengers Compound and orders Nebula to bring him the Infinity Stones. While attempting to do so, Nebula is confronted by her prime self and Gamora, who try to convince her to abandon Thanos. However, she refuses, and is killed by the prime Nebula.

What If...? 

Several alternate versions of Nebula appear in the animated series What If...?, with Gillan reprising her role.

Working with Star-Lord T'Challa 

In an alternate 2008, Nebula (marketed as Heist Nebula) is a close ally and love interest of Star-Lord T'Challa. This version does not have cybernetic body parts except for her left eye and is shown to have full-grown blonde hair. She joins with T'Challa, a reformed Thanos, and the Ravagers on a mission to steal the Embers of Genesis from the Collector, and visits Wakanda with them following the mission. She does get annoyed with Thanos' discussion with Okoye.

Attending Thor's party 

In an alternate 2011, Nebula participates in Thor's intergalactic party on Earth, where she is seen gambling in Las Vegas with Korg. Later, when Thor requests the guests to help clean up the mess on Earth, Nebula and the guests dismiss him with Nebula claiming that she thinks she hears her father calling her. The party guests change their minds when they hear that Frigga is coming.

Characterization

In her debut in Guardians of the Galaxy, Nebula is depicted as a loyal lieutenant in the employ of Ronan and Thanos. About the character, Gillan said, "She is the female villain of the film ... She is very sadistic and evil, but I like to think for a very valid reason." She also added, "I think she's a really interesting character. What I like to play around with is how jealous she is. She's Gamora's sister, and there's a lot of sibling rivalry. That's the most interesting aspect to me, because jealousy can consume you and turn you bitter, and ugly. And she's a total sadist, so that's fun too." Gillan researched the ancient Spartans, shaved off her hair, and trained for two months for the role. The character's makeup took approximately four-and-a-half hours to be applied. On the first day of filming, as Gillan and Gunn discussed on how to portray the character, Gunn suggested an impression of Marilyn Monroe, particularly in her breathy delivery which he considered "a similar voice to Clint Eastwood."

In early drafts of the film, the character was planned to be killed off by Gamora, but the directors decided to bring her back in the sequel to further explore the relationship between the two. In Guardians of the Galaxy Vol. 2, Nebula is portrayed as a reluctant member of the Guardians.
Gillan stated the film would further explore the sisterly relationship between Nebula and Gamora, including their backstory "and what happened to these two girls growing up and actually how awful it was for them and how it has ruined their relationship", adding "we're [also] going to start to see how much pain [Thanos] actually caused [Nebula]... we really start to see the emotional crack in her character". While Gillan had to shave her head for the first film, she only had to shave half of her head for the sequel, taking away the underneath part and leaving the top. Gillan's makeup took two and a half hours to apply, down from five hours for the first film.

In Avengers: Endgame, after being previously featured as an antagonist or an anti-hero, Nebula undergoes a redemption arc where she makes amends for her past actions, including an encounter with a past version of herself, with Gillan adding that she is "staring her former self in the face and it's really clear how far she's come from that angry, bitter and twisted person. She's starting to connect with other people and find some level of forgiveness." Gillan guessed that Nebula would play a prominent role in the film when she realized that Infinity War and Endgame would be adapted from The Infinity Gauntlet, which she had previously read when she was initially cast as Nebula in Guardians of the Galaxy (2014). Gillan shared several scenes with Robert Downey Jr., who portrays Tony Stark, in the film's opening, and the two improvised most of their scenes together.

Nebula in the Marvel Cinematic Universe ultimately evolves from a villain to a true hero and a member of the Guardians of the Galaxy, while the character in Marvel Comics is depicted almost exclusively as a villain. Another change in the film adaptation from the source material is the character's physical appearance, with the character's MCU depiction eschewing Nebula's initial depiction as an organic humanoid with curled hair to focus on her later one as a bald cyborg. She is not revealed to be related to Gamora in the comics and claimed to be the "granddaughter" of Thanos, which he denies. She also has ambitious villainous goals throughout various publications. Later comic interpretations of Nebula, such as a 2020 eponymous miniseries, would change her look to appear closer to the Marvel Cinematic Universe interpretation.

In July 2021, Gillan said that for her appearance in Thor: Love and Thunder, director Taika Waititi brought out the "bonkers side" of Nebula through her "pure aggression". In September 2021, Gunn noted that for both Pom Klementieff's Mantis and Gillan's Nebula "their roles are both pretty huge" in the script for Guardians of the Galaxy Vol. 3.

Reception
Jacob Stolworthy of The Independent felt that the character had "all the makings of being a vintage Marvel character", but was "slightly short-changed". Miles Surrey of The Ringer, meanwhile, praised the character, saying that "Nebula's internal conflict is one of the most fascinating and compelling threads the MCU has spun over its 20-plus installments" and that the character was "starkly different from virtually everybody in the MCU" as a villain-turned-hero. Richard Newby of The Hollywood Reporter also praised the character's depiction, describing her as "one of the most meaningful considerations of what it means to be both Avenger and human", opining that her story is "one [of] the Marvel Cinematic Universe's best and most empowering myths".

Awards and nominations

See also 

 Characters of the Marvel Cinematic Universe

References

External links 
 Nebula on the Marvel Cinematic Universe Wiki
 
 Nebula on Marvel.com

Avengers (film series)
Cyborg superheroes
Cyborg supervillains
Female characters in film
Female film villains
Fictional characters from parallel universes
Fictional characters with superhuman durability or invulnerability
Fictional female assassins
Fictional extraterrestrial cyborgs
Fictional genocide survivors
Fictional humanoids
Fictional mercenaries
Fictional outlaws
Fictional stick-fighters
Fictional women soldiers and warriors
Film characters introduced in 2014
Guardians of the Galaxy (film series)
Guardians of the Galaxy characters
Karen Gillan
Marvel Cinematic Universe characters
Marvel Comics characters with accelerated healing
Marvel Comics characters with superhuman strength
Marvel Comics cyborgs
Marvel Comics extraterrestrial superheroes
Marvel Comics extraterrestrial supervillains
Marvel Comics female superheroes
Marvel Comics female supervillains
Orphan characters in film
Space pirates
Superheroes who are adopted
Film supervillains